Senator Pangelinan may refer to:

Ben Pangelinan (1955–2014), Senate of Guam
Maria Frica Pangelinan (born 1948), Senate of the Northern Mariana Islands